Dennis Burns (May 24, 1898 – May 21, 1969) was a professional baseball player.  He was a right-handed pitcher over parts of two seasons (1923–24) with the Philadelphia Athletics.  For his career, he compiled an 8–9 record, with a 4.62 earned run average, and 34 strikeouts in 181 innings pitched. He was an alumnus of the University of Missouri.

External links

1898 births
1969 deaths
People from McDonald County, Missouri
Philadelphia Athletics players
Major League Baseball pitchers
Baseball players from Missouri
Suffolk Wildcats players
Shreveport Gassers players
Portland Beavers players
Fort Worth Panthers players
Kansas City Blues (baseball) players
Beaumont Exporters players
Mobile Bears players
Knoxville Smokies players
Birmingham Barons players
Fort Worth Cats players
Tulsa Oilers (baseball) players
St. Joseph Ponies players
Carthage Browns players
University of Missouri alumni
Neosho Yankees players